is a Japanese former butterfly swimmer. He competed in three events at the 1968 Summer Olympics.

References

External links
 

1947 births
Living people
Japanese male butterfly swimmers
Olympic swimmers of Japan
Swimmers at the 1968 Summer Olympics
Sportspeople from Saitama Prefecture
Asian Games medalists in swimming
Asian Games gold medalists for Japan
Asian Games silver medalists for Japan
Swimmers at the 1970 Asian Games
Medalists at the 1970 Asian Games
20th-century Japanese people